David King Dunaway is an American historian. He is a professor of English at the University of New Mexico in Albuquerque, New Mexico; he was previously on the faculty of San Francisco State University in San Francisco. He was also the first consultant to the UNESCO Program on Intangible Cultural Heritage.

Books 
David Dunaway's first book, How Can I Keep From Singing, the first biography of folk musician and social activist Pete Seeger, was based on his doctoral dissertation at the University of California, Berkeley, and first released in 1981. Since then, it has been translated into Japanese and Spanish and been through six printings. Working with Seeger, Dunaway completed a revised, updated version of the biography in 2008 from Villard Books/Random House.

In addition, Dunaway is also the editor of Oral History: An Interdisciplinary Anthology (with Willa Baum; second edition, Rowman & Littlefield, 1996), and the author of Huxley in Hollywood (Harper Collins, 1990), Writing the Southwest (with Sarah Spurgeon; revised edition, University of New Mexico Press, 2003), Aldous Huxley Recollected (AltaMira/Rowman & Littlefield, 1998), Across the Tracks: A Route 66 Story (in press), Oral History on Route 66: A Manual (National Park Service, 2005), Singing Out: An Oral History of America's Folk Music Revivals (with Molly Beer; Oxford, 2010), A Pete Seeger Discography (Scarecrow Press/Rowman, 2011), and A Route 66 Companion (University of Texas Press, 2012). His most recent work is "Researching Route 66: A Bibliographical Guide" (with Stephen Mandrgoc) (National Park Service, 2023).

Radio series 
Dunaway has been active in radio since 1972, when he produced "Midnight Country" for KPFA-FM in Berkeley. Four of his radio documentary series were developed in conjunction with his writing – "Writing the Southwest" (1995) developed with funding from the NEH and the Humanities Endowments in Arizona, Colorado, and New Mexico; "Aldous Huxley's Brave New Worlds" (1998) funded by the California and New Mexico Endowments for the Humanities and Public Radio International; and "Across the Tracks: A Route 66 Story" (2001) which received awards from the International Radio Festival, the Associated Press, and a Silver Reel. In 2008-9, he produced "Pete Seeger" on PRI, three, one-hour documentaries airing on more than 300 stations and winning Best of Show: Audio from the Broadcast Education Association. He is currently a DJ for KUNM-FM in Albuquerque, NM.

His newest radio series is titled "Music of the Nuclear Age" where he discusses America's response to nuclear power and energy through popular folk songs. Visit https://nuclearmusic.online/ to listen to the show.

Magazine and journal articles 
Dunaway has written extensively for the popular media since 1973, with articles on music, social activism, and oral history appearing in venues from Mother Jones to the Village Voice and the New York Times. In 2004, his writing on the Danish government's efforts to derail the world's oldest experiment in anarchy, Christiania, was carried by the San Francisco Chronicleand National Public Radio's Morning Edition.

Dunaway also writes extensively for academic audiences, contributing his articles to scholarly journals such as the Oral History Review and The Public Historian, the Journal of American Folklore, Southwestern American Literature, and New Media and Society.

Current projects 
Dunaway works with the National Park Service's Route 66 Corridor Preservation Program. After a three-year research project locating, identifying, and cataloguing archives on Route 66, with a particular focus on oral history collections, he's now interviewing Route 66's historians and planning a nationwide project to interpret Route 66. He has recently completed an anthology, A Route 66 Companion. Dunaway is Professor of English and Communications (adjunct) at the University of New Mexico.

He is also working on a book targeted toward what he calls the "Glasser" community. His goal is to encourage healing amongst glasses-wearers who've suffered bullying and develop new ways of looking at ourselves and others.

Bibliography 
Dunaway's published materials include:

In 2008, Dunaway's biography of Pete Seeger (originally published in 1981) was re-released along with a three part audio series covering Seeger's life and music. According to reviewer Michael Huntsberger, the series also included "recordings of Charles Seeger (Pete's father), Leadbelly, and Woody Guthrie, and interviews with Pete Seeger's contemporaries," including a selection of Seeger's music.

References

University of California, Berkeley alumni
University of New Mexico faculty
American academics of English literature
Year of birth missing (living people)
Living people
American biographers
American male biographers